1st & Repair is a 1998 album by Monte Montgomery.

Track listing

Personnel
Monte Montgomery – Guitar, Vocals
Phil Bass – Drums, Percussion
Chris Maresh – Bass

Monte Montgomery albums
1998 albums